Alexander Cabagnot Jr. (born December 8, 1982) is a Filipino professional basketball player for the Terrafirma Dyip of the Philippine Basketball Association (PBA). He plays the point guard position. Alex once had a rivalry with Mark Caguioa for the Eagle Rock High School scoring record. He was also part of the coaching staff of the UP Fighting Maroons men's basketball team in the UAAP.

Professional career
He was drafted by the Sta. Lucia Realtors, but after playing 2 seasons he was dealt to the Coca-Cola Tigers along with the aging Kenneth Duremdes and Ricky Calimag in exchange for Denok Miranda, Manny Ramos and Coca-Cola's 2007 second round draft pick.

Cabagnot led all rookies during his rookie year in scoring (10.3 points per game), assists (4.7), steals (1.1) and minutes played (28.1). He was third in the league in the assist-to-turnover ratio (2.5) behind Jimmy Alapag and Johnny Abarrientos.

On January 5, 2010, he was traded to the Burger King Whoppers along with Wesley Gonzales, for Gary David and Chico Lanete. He played for several games with Burger King, finishing at the 8th spot of the 2009-10 PBA Philippine Cup. During the off-season of the 2009–2010 Fiesta Conference, he was traded to the San Miguel Beermen, for Mike Cortez.

As a Beermen, Cabagnot quickly emerged as the starting quarterback for the team. Cabagnot dropped game winning shots during eliminations earning his nickname "The Crunchman". He did it on Alaska Aces, B-Meg Derby Ace Llmados scoring a basket on crucial possession. During Game 1 of the 2010 – 2011 PBA Philippine Cup semifinals series against the crowd favorite Ginebra Gin Kings, Alex made a clutch basket leaving the Gin Kings with only over a second. This nailed the series to a 1 – 0 lead in favor of the Beermen. SMB eventually won the  duel in six games 4 – 2. In 2011, Cabagnot together with Arwind Santos and Danny Ildefonso lead Petron Blaze Boosters to a Governor's Cup title by hacking out a 4–3 decider in 7 games, thus foiling the Grand Slam bid of Talk N Text & captured his first PBA crown as a player.

On February 18, 2014, he was part of a complex four-team, seven player trade which sent him to GlobalPort. With his new team, he reunites with old teammate Jay Washington and provided veteran leadership. He said, "(The trade) came a little bit as an ‘I-didn’t-see-it-coming,' but when it did sink in, I just have to be a pro, go to the next team and try to do what I did with Petron and my other teams before". On June 11, 2014, Cabagnot almost recorded a triple-double for GlobalPort Batang Piers as he racked up 19 points, 8 rebounds and 10 assists but in a losing effort to the Air21 Express.

On October 26, 2014, Cabagnot recorded 21 points, 10 rebounds and 3 assists in a win over the Barako Bull Energy Boosters.

During the playoffs of the 2014–15 PBA Philippine Cup,  Alex Cabagnot was traded back to San Miguel for Sol Mercado.

On October 14, 2016, Cabagnot was recognized during the PBA Leo Awards Night as he was named to the PBA Mythcial Second Team.

On June 21, 2019, during the 2019 Commissioner's Cup, Cabagnot scored a conference-high 31 points to go along with 4 rebounds and 6 assists in a win over the Alaska Aces. He led the Beermen in a much-needed win as they now have a record of 2–3 for the conference.

On November 13, 2021, he was traded to the Terrafirma Dyip for Simon Enciso. On December 18, he suffered a torn achilles tendon during a game against the NLEX Road Warriors which ended his season.

On April 14, 2022, he signed a two-year contract extension with Terrafirma.

PBA career statistics

As of the end of 2022–23 season

Season-by-season averages

|-
| align=left | 
| align=left | Sta. Lucia
| 35 || 28.1 || .349 || .266 || .681 || 3.3 || 4.7 || 1.1 || .3 || 10.3
|-
| align=left rowspan=2| 
| align=left | Sta. Lucia
| rowspan=2|45 || rowspan=2|33.3 || rowspan=2|.424 || rowspan=2|.322 || rowspan=2|.703 || rowspan=2|3.5 || rowspan=2|6.4 || rowspan=2|1.3 || rowspan=2|.2 || rowspan=2|10.9
|-
| align=left | Coca-Cola
|-
| align=left | 
| align=left | Coca-Cola
| 37 || 33.8 || .343 || .360 || .667 || 3.0 || 4.6 || 1.1 || .2 || 11.0
|-
| align=left | 
| align=left | Coca-Cola
| 32 || 37.0 || .356 || .240 || .667 || 3.6 || 5.3 || 1.4 || .4 || 10.8
|-
| align=left rowspan=3| 
| align=left | Coca-Cola
| rowspan=3|50 || rowspan=3|23.0 || rowspan=3|.376 || rowspan=3|.250 || rowspan=3|.693 || rowspan=3|3.6 || rowspan=3|5.5 || rowspan=3|1.0 || rowspan=3|.3 || rowspan=3|10.2
|-
| align=left | Burger King
|-
| align=left | San Miguel
|-
| align=left | 
| align=left | San Miguel / Petron
| 54 || 30.2 || .395 || .321 || .728 || 4.2 || 5.8 || 1.0 || .4 || 9.7
|-
| align=left | 
| align=left | Petron
| 46 || 35.5 || .390 || .384 || .745 || 3.6 || 6.2 || 1.1 || .3 || 13.4
|-
| align=left | 
| align=left | Petron
| 47 || 32.2 || .407 || .321 || .747 || 3.7 || 5.1 || 1.2 || .2 || 11.9
|-
| align=left rowspan=2| 
| align=left | Petron 
| rowspan=2|34 || rowspan=2|35.6 || rowspan=2|.378 || rowspan=2|.311 || rowspan=2|.696 || rowspan=2|4.4 || rowspan=2|6.2 || rowspan=2|1.3 || rowspan=2|.2 || rowspan=2|13.1
|-
| align=left | GlobalPort
|-
| align=left rowspan=2| 
| align=left | GlobalPort
| rowspan=2|52 || rowspan=2|29.5 || rowspan=2|.366 || rowspan=2|.350 || rowspan=2|.705 || rowspan=2|4.5 || rowspan=2|4.7 || rowspan=2|.8 || rowspan=2|.1 || rowspan=2|11.1
|-
| align=left | San Miguel
|-
| align=left | 
| align=left | San Miguel
| 56 || 32.5 || .404 || .342 || .745 || 3.6 || 4.0 || 1.0 || .1 || 14.3
|-
| align=left | 
| align=left | San Miguel
| 56 || 35.8 || .386 || .339 || .765 || 5.5 || 4.5 || 1.3 || .1 || 16.2
|-
| align=left | 
| align=left | San Miguel
| 51 || 34.0 || .375 || .276 || .795 || 4.6 || 5.4 || 1.3 || .1 || 13.8
|-
| align=left | 
| align=left | San Miguel
| 56 || 29.9 || .383 || .325 || .790 || 3.3 || 3.7 || 1.2 || .1 || 13.3
|-
| align=left | 
| align=left | San Miguel
| 12 || 29.6 || .401 || .250 || .711 || 3.8 || 3.8 || .8 || .0 || 12.6
|-
| align=left rowspan=2| 
| align=left | San Miguel
| rowspan=2|17 || rowspan=2|23.9 || rowspan=2|.390 || rowspan=2|.208 || rowspan=2|.743 || rowspan=2|3.3 || rowspan=2|3.0 || rowspan=2|.4 || rowspan=2|.0 || rowspan=2|10.5
|-
| align=left | Terrafirma
|-
| align=left | 
| align=left | Terrafirma
| 20 || 25.1 || .306 || .250 || .667 || 3.6 || 4.9 || .5 || .1 || 8.0
|- class=sortbottom
| align=center colspan=2 | Career
| 700 || 31.6 || .381 || .317 || .728 || 3.9 || 5.0 || 1.1 || .2 || 12.1

Off the court 
In December 2019, Cabagnot, along with his cousin Cris Gopez, established Fil-Am Nation Select, a program where young players with Filipino lineage can know more about Philippine basketball in the hope of bringing them over to play in leagues or even with Gilas Pilipinas. Aside from basketball, they have expanded the program to include volleyball, football, ice hockey, and baseball. Among the basketball players Fil-Am Nation has handled include college standout Zavier Lucero and pro Sedrick Barefield.

Cabagnot and Gopez also handle a basketball recreation league, Edge Basketball International, that boasts Atlanta Hawks draftee Onyeka Okongwu as one of its former players.

References

External links
 PBA Official Website

1982 births
Living people
Barako Bull Energy players
Basketball players from Quezon City
Filipino men's basketball coaches
Filipino men's basketball players
Hawaii–Hilo Vulcans
Los Angeles Valley Monarchs men's basketball players
NorthPort Batang Pier players
Philippine Basketball Association All-Stars
Philippines men's national basketball team players
Point guards
Powerade Tigers players
San Miguel Beermen players
Shooting guards
Sta. Lucia Realtors players
Sta. Lucia Realtors draft picks
Terrafirma Dyip players
UP Fighting Maroons basketball coaches